Johan Henrik Hellén (20 December 1939 – 5 May 1998) was a Finnish athlete. He competed in the men's high jump at the 1964 Summer Olympics.

References

External links
 

1939 births
1998 deaths
People from Kimitoön
Swedish-speaking Finns
Finnish male high jumpers
Olympic athletes of Finland
Athletes (track and field) at the 1964 Summer Olympics
Sportspeople from Southwest Finland